Oliver Joseph Casey (born 14 October 2000) is an English professional footballer who plays as a centre-back for Forest Green Rovers, on loan from Blackpool. He has previously played for Leeds United.

Career

Leeds United
Born in Leeds, Casey came through the academy at Leeds United. After impressing for Leeds' under 18s and under 23s, he signed a two-year professional contract with Leeds United in November 2018, making his professional debut on 7 December 2019 as an 85th-minute substitute for Mateusz Klich in a 2–0 victory at Huddersfield Town. With Leeds promoted to the Premier League as Championship champions and Casey receiving a Championship winners medal, he signed a new three-year contract with the club on 14 July 2020. Casey made two appearances for Leeds' first team across the 2020–21 season, both in cup competitions, whilst he made 21 appearances for the under-23 side as they won the Premier League 2 Division Two for the 2020–21 season.

Blackpool
On 22 June 2021, Casey signed a three-year contract with Blackpool, which went through on 1 July, for an undisclosed fee. It included the option to extend by an additional year.

Career statistics

Honours
Leeds United
EFL Championship: 2019–20

References

2000 births
Living people
Footballers from Leeds
English footballers
Association football defenders
Leeds United F.C. players
Blackpool F.C. players
Forest Green Rovers F.C. players
English Football League players